Luiz Phellype Luciano Silva (born 27 September 1993), known as Luiz Phellype, is a Brazilian professional footballer who plays as a striker for Super League Greece club OFI.

Career
Luiz Phellype made his professional debut with Standard Liége in December 2012, a few months after arriving at the Belgian First Division A club from Brazil. After two solar years (from January 2017 till December 2018) playing for Paços de Ferreira, Luiz Phellype signed with Sporting CP, with players Rafael Barbosa and Elves Baldé moving to the opposite direction, on loan. He netted his first goal for the Lisbon side in a 3–1 away win against Chaves.

On 30 August 2021, Phellype joined Santa Clara on a season-long loan.

On 27 January 2022, Phellype joined OFI on a six months' loan.

Honours

Sporting CP
Taça da Liga: 2018–19
 Taça de Portugal: 2018–19

Recreativo do Libolo
Supertaça de Angola: 2016

References

1993 births
Living people
Sportspeople from Minas Gerais
Brazilian footballers
Belgian Pro League players
Liga Portugal 2 players
Primeira Liga players
Campeonato de Portugal (league) players
Super League Greece players
Girabola players
Desportivo Brasil players
Standard Liège players
S.C. Beira-Mar players
G.D. Estoril Praia players
C.D. Feirense players
C.R.D. Libolo players
F.C. Paços de Ferreira players
Sporting CP footballers
Sporting CP B players
C.D. Santa Clara players
FC Tokyo players
OFI Crete F.C. players
Association football forwards
Brazilian expatriate footballers
Expatriate footballers in Belgium
Brazilian expatriate sportspeople in Belgium
Expatriate footballers in Portugal
Brazilian expatriate sportspeople in Portugal
Expatriate footballers in Angola
Brazilian expatriate sportspeople in Angola
Expatriate footballers in Greece
Brazilian expatriate sportspeople in Greece
Expatriate footballers in Japan
Brazilian expatriate sportspeople in Japan